The Celtic Roots Festival is a Celtic festival held annually in the town of Goderich, Ontario. The festival celebrates traditional Celtic music and craft by showcasing a wide variety of musicians and artisans. Musical acts have come from as far afield as Ireland, Scotland, and Wales, but have also included popular North American folk artists such as Maura O'Connell, The Wailin' Jennys, and Garnet Rogers. The festival was first held in 1992.

External links
Official web site

Folk festivals in Canada
Music festivals in Ontario
Goderich, Ontario
Recurring events established in 1992
Celtic music festivals